Tatamagouche Mountain is a community in the Canadian province of Nova Scotia, located  in Colchester County.

References
Tatamagouche Mountain entry in Canadian Geographical Names (Department of Natural Resources Canada)

Communities in Colchester County
General Service Areas in Nova Scotia